Harry Edwards (born 1 October 2000) is an Australian rules footballer who plays for the West Coast Eagles in the Australian Football League (AFL). He was recruited by the West Coast with the 18th draft pick in the 2018 AFL rookie draft. Edwards was drafted as 195cm in height, measured at preseason training as 197cm, grew to 200cm in his second year and now stands 204cm tall. This followed 11cm of growth from 184cm to 195cm at 17 years of age, in his draft year.

Early football
Edwards played junior football for Mazenod Junior Football Club in Western Australia. He also played for the Swan Districts Football Club in the Western Australian Football League for the 2018 season. He played fifteen games and kicked six goals, at that time playing as a ruckman and forward.

AFL career
Edwards debuted in the Eagles' 9 point win against Geelong Football Club in the 9th round of the 2020 AFL season. Edwards was concussed midway through the second quarter and did not return to the ground. On debut, Edwards picked up 3 disposals. Edwards was upgraded from the rookie list at the conclusion of the season, re-signing until 2022.

Statistics
 Statistics are correct to the end of 2020

|- style="background-color: #eaeaea"
! scope="row" style="text-align:center" | 2019
|  || 42 || 0 || — || — || — || — || — || — || — || — || — || — || — || — || — || —
|- style="background-color: #EAEAEA"
! scope="row" style="text-align:center" | 2020
|style="text-align:center;"|
| 42 || 1 || 0 || 0 || 2 || 1 || 3 || 0 || 0 || 0.0 || 0.0 || 2.0 || 1.0 || 3.0 || 0.0 || 0.0
|- style="background:#EAEAEA; font-weight:bold; width:2em"
| scope="row" text-align:center class="sortbottom" colspan=3 | Career
| 1
| 0
| 0
| 2
| 1
| 3
| 0
| 0
| 0.0
| 0.0
| 2.0
| 1.0
| 3.0
| 0.0
| 0.0
|}

References

External links

2000 births
Living people
West Coast Eagles players
Australian rules footballers from Western Australia
Swan Districts Football Club players
West Coast Eagles (WAFL) players